Chocolate and Ice is an EP from Louisville, Kentucky indie rock band My Morning Jacket.  It was released on March 26, 2002 by Badman Recording Co. All the songs on the EP were written and performed by band leader Jim James, and no other band members appear on the album, with the exception of the track "It's Been a Great 3 Or 4 Years", a voicemail from his cousin, guitarist John McQuade (Johnny Quaid). The inside packaging indicates the album was mastered at Abbey Road Studios. Only "Sooner" and "Cobra" have become live favorites, with "Sweetheart" having only been performed in concert once, in 2006. As of 2021, "Can You See the Hard Helmet on My Head?" and "Holy" have never been performed live.

Track listing
All songs by Jim James.
 "Can You See The Hard Helmet On My Head?" – 3:43
 "Sooner" – 3:37
 "Cobra" – 24:12
 "It's Been A Great 3 Or 4 Years" – 4:00
 "Holy" – 1:59
 "Sweetheart" – 3:04

Personnel
Jim James – Instruments and vocals
Johnny Quaid – Vocal ("It's Been A Great 3 Or 4 Years")

References

My Morning Jacket EPs
2002 EPs
Albums produced by Jim James